Notable people with the surname Eton include:

 Elon Eton (alternate name for Elon Howard Eaton, 1866–1934), American ornithologist, scholar, and author
Peter Eton (1917–1980), British radio and television producer 
Richard Eton (early 15th. c.), English politician

See also
Eaton (surname)